= Maruda (Slavic demon) =

Slavic Myths

Maruda is a demon in Slavic mythology in female form, who is said to have harassed children in a cradle. In the 19th century it was believed that using magical methods was necessary to deal with the demon successfully. For instance, people put three spindles, three spoons and sewing into the bowl of water as to make the harasser busy enough to let the baby sleep undisturbed.
